Eraly Luqpanuly Togjanov (born 13 May 1963) is a Kazakh politician who is  Governor of Aktobe Region.

Biography

Early life and education 
Born in the village of Shagatai, Togjanov graduated in 1988 from Karagandy State University, majoring in law. In 1994 he graduated from the Kazakhstan Academy of Sciences.

Career 
He began his career in 1980 as a worker in the Octyabrsky Forestry of the Ural Region.

From 1988 to 1991, Togjanov was a lecturer in the Department of Theory and History of State and Law at the Karaganda State University. In 1994, he became a senior lecturer and the deputy dean at the Faculty of Public Administration and International Law of the Kazakh Humanitarian Law University. In 1997 Togjanov became its dean. From 1999 to 2001, he was the director of the branch, then the Institute of Rights and Public Service in the university.

In 2001, Togjanov became the deputy akim of Karaganda Region. From 2006 to 2008, he served as the chairman of the Council for Religious Affairs of the Ministry of Justice of Kazakhstan. From 2008 to 2017, Togjanov was the deputy chairman and the administrative secretary of the Assembly of People of Kazakhstan in the Presidential Administration of Kazakhstan.

On 14 March 2017, Togjanov was appointed as the akim of the Mangystau Region until he was dismissed on 13 June 2019. From 16 September 2019 to 11 February 2020, Togjanov served as the chairman of the Federation of Trade Unions of Kazakhstan.

On 11 February 2020, he was appointed as the Deputy Prime Minister of Kazakhstan. While serving as Deputy Prime Minister, Togjanov had tested positive for COVID-19 on 19 June 2020. In response, he went into self-isolation. On 1 July 2020, it was reported that Togjanov had recovered from the virus.

Since August 31, 2022, he works as Governor of Aktobe Region.

References

Kazakhstani people
1963 births
Living people
Deputy Prime Ministers of Kazakhstan